"A Bitter Day" is a song recorded by South Korean singer Hyuna featuring Yong Jun-hyung and G.NA for her debut extended play Bubble Pop! (2011). It was released as the lead single from the EP by Cube Entertainment and Universal Music on June 30, 2011. The lyrics were written by Choi Kyu-sung and Yong Jun-hyung.

Composition
The lyrics were written by Choi Kyu-sung and Yong Jun-hyung.

Release
On June 29, it was announced that Hyuna would be releasing a digital single, the only ballad song from her debut EP Bubble Pop!.
The single, which features Cube Entertainment label-mates G.NA and BEAST's Yong Jun-hyung was released on June 30, 2011.

Credits and personnel
Credits adapted from Melon.

 Hyuna – vocals, rapping
 Yong Jun-hyung – rapping, songwriting
 G.NA – vocals
 Choi Kyu-sung – songwriting, producer

Chart performance
The song debuted at number 10 on the South Korean Gaon Digital Chart.

Charts

Release history

References 

2011 songs
Hyuna songs